The American Society of Crime Laboratory Directors (ASCLD, pronounced 'azz-clad') is a nonprofit society for forensic science. Membership is multinational, and is open to crime lab directors, managers or supervisors. ASCLD holds an annual members' conference, in which management training is given and networking is encouraged.

History
The origins of ASCLD lie in a meeting of crime laboratory directors organised in 1973 by Clarence Kelly and Briggs White, of the FBI. At this meeting, a steering committee was formed, which brought ASCLD into being in 1974. The first meeting was held in Quantico.

In the 1980s, ASCLD created subcommittee to develop standards for crime laboratories.  This subcommittee was spun off as a separate organization, The American Society of Crime Laboratory Directors Laboratory Accreditation Board, or ASCLD/LAB.  ASCLD/LAB merged with ANSI National Accreditation Board (ANAB) in 2016.

References

Forensics organizations